Salvia uribei is a herbaceous perennial that is endemic to a single small valley between Tunja and Cucaita in Colombia. It grows in dry scrub, along with Salvia palifolia and Peperomia species, between  elevation. It was named after Lorenzo Uribe Uribe, who discovered the plant, and has made significant contributions to Colombian botany.

Notes

uribei
Endemic flora of Colombia